The northern white-faced darter (Leucorrhinia rubicunda) or the ruby whiteface is a dragonfly found in Europe as far east as the Altai Mountains. It is predominantly northern in its distribution, being one of the few dragonflies common north of the Arctic Circle. Its most southerly location is Northern Belgium and it is found through Germany, Poland, Czech Republic, Fennoscandia, Belarus, Ukraine and Russia.

Habitat
The Northern white-faced darter is commonly found, it it's natural habitat, around peatlands and bogs

References

Libellulidae 
Dragonflies of Europe
Insects described in 1758
Taxa named by Carl Linnaeus